The  Morne Dubois least gecko (Sphaerodactylus nycteropus) is a species of lizard in the family Sphaerodactylidae. The species is endemic to Haiti.

Geographic range
S. nycteropus is found on the Morne Dubois Peninsula, Département du Sud, Haiti.

Reproduction
S. nycteropus is oviparous.

References

Further reading
Schwartz A, Henderson RW (1991). Amphibians and Reptiles of the West Indies: Descriptions, Distributions, and Natural History. Gainesville: University of Florida Press. 720 pp. . (Sphaerodactylus nycteropus, p. 516).
Thomas R, Schwartz A (1977). "Three New Species of Sphaerodactylus (Sauria: Gekkonidae) from Hispaniola". Annals of Carnegie Museum 46: 33–43. (Sphaerodactylus nycteropus, new species, p. 41).

Sphaerodactylus
Reptiles of Haiti
Endemic fauna of Haiti
Reptiles described in 1977
Taxa named by Albert Schwartz (zoologist)
Taxa named by Richard Thomas (herpetologist)